Vavdin (also Romanized as Vāvdīn; also known as ‘Ābedīn and ‘Ābedīn) is a village in Zarem Rud Rural District, Hezarjarib District, Neka County, Mazandaran Province, Iran. At the 2006 census, its population was 143, in 34 families.

References 

Populated places in Neka County